Castrillo may refer to:

People

 Carlos Castrillo (born 1985), football player
 Demetrio Alonso Castrillo (1841–1916), politician and lawyer
 Eduardo Castrillo (born 1942), sculptor
 Lourdes Castrillo Brillantes, author
 Roberto Castrillo (born 1941), sports shooter

Places

 Castrillo de Cabrera
 Castrillo de Don Juan
 Castrillo de Onielo
 Castrillo de Riopisuerga
 Castrillo de Villavega
 Castrillo de la Guareña
 Castrillo de la Reina
 Castrillo de la Valduerna
 Castrillo de la Vega
 Castrillo del Val
 Castrillo Mota de Judíos

See also

 Castrilli